Kristina Kiss (born February 13, 1981) is a female soccer midfielder, who twice won a medal with the Canada national team at the Pan American Games: 2003 and 2007.

Career
On March 12, 2000 at the Algarve Cup, 19 year old Kristina made her debut for Canada's Senior Women's Team vs powerhouse China. This is where she began her National Team journey under newly appointed coach Even Pellerud. Always playing the ball with precision Kristina scored in her fifth game with Canada on May 31, 2000 in a 2:1 win over New Zealand helping the team finish fourth at the 2000 CONCACAF Gold Cup. Later the team and Kristina would have continued success by finishing; 2nd at both the 2002 CONCACAF Gold Cup, 2nd at the XIV Pan American Games (2003) in Santo Domingo where Kristina scored Canada's tying goal in a 2-1 loss to Brazil in the final. She also finished; 4th with Canada at the FIFA Women's World Cup USA in 2003, 2nd with Canada at the 2006 CONCACAF Gold Cup - lost 2:1 to the United States in the final, 3rd at the XV Pan American Games (2007) in Rio, represented Canada at the FIFA Women's World Cup China 2007, 2nd at the 2008 CONCACAF Women's Olympic Qualification Tournament, quarter-finalist at the 2008 Women's Olympic Football Tournament. She was also a National Club Champion with the Nepean United Spirit in 1998.

Kristina was named the top Ottawa soccer player for the 2008 season. Recognized at the annual Ottawa Sports Awards, claiming the Athlete of the Year. She was later invited to join the U20 Women's National Team as a guest coach in July 2009. She was inducted into the Ottawa Sports Hall of Fame in 2015. She now dedicates her time to becoming a professional coach successfully completed her CSA National A Licence, Youth Licence and Children's Licence. She understands her position as a role model to the female players in the Ottawa community and is committed to developing elite players who may one day follow in her footsteps on the Canada National Team.
Kiss was the captain of Team Canada's 2003 Pan American Games team and scored three goals in the tournament. She returned to the national team in 2006 after a two-year absence,.

Personal
She won the Canadian National Junior Judo Championship in 1995 in the under 44 kg category. Kiss studied philosophy and psychology at the Carleton University.

Coaching career
After retiring, she became the technical director of West Ottawa Soccer Club in 2012. In 2021, she served as a guest coach with the Canadian national women's team ahead of their gold medal performance at the Olympics. In 2022, she joined Ottawa City SC as technical female manager.

References

External links
Canada Olympic Committee
West Ottawa Soccer Club

1981 births
Living people
Canadian women's soccer players
Canada women's international soccer players
Women's association football midfielders
Soccer players from Ottawa
Carleton University alumni
2003 FIFA Women's World Cup players
2007 FIFA Women's World Cup players
Footballers at the 2007 Pan American Games
Pan American Games silver medalists for Canada
Pan American Games bronze medalists for Canada
Pan American Games medalists in football
Medalists at the 2007 Pan American Games
Footballers at the 2003 Pan American Games
Medalists at the 2003 Pan American Games
Toppserien players
IF Fløya players
Amazon Grimstad players
Canadian expatriate sportspeople in Norway
Expatriate women's footballers in Norway
Ottawa Fury (women) players
USL W-League (1995–2015) players